Hanuman is an Indian name that may refer to
Guru Hanuman (1901–1999), Indian wrestling coach
Hanuman Prasad, Indian politician
Hanuman Singh, Indian basketball player
Hanuman Singh Budania, Indian social worker and freedom fighter 

Indian masculine given names